Joan Hilda Westbrook (17 February 1923 – 25 January 2000) was an English cricketer who played as a wicket-keeper. She appeared in 3 Test matches for England in 1954, all against New Zealand. She played domestic cricket for Surrey.

References

External links
 
 

1923 births
2000 deaths
People from Hackney Central
England women Test cricketers
Surrey women cricketers
Wicket-keepers